Pterophorus ischnodactyla is a moth of the family Pterophoridae. It is known from South Africa, Bahrain, Oman, Yemen, Iraq, Israel, Lebanon, Syria, Turkey, Pakistan, Mongolia, Libya, Algeria, Ukraine and southern Europe.

The species is characterized by the pale ochreous-white colour and the small black dots along the costa and dorsum of the forewing.

The larvae feed on Convolvulus cantabrica.

References

ischnodactyla
Moths of Africa
Moths of Europe
Insects of the Arabian Peninsula
Moths described in 1833